Statistics of the Brunei Premier League for the 2007–08 season.

Overview
It was contested by 12 teams, and QAF FC won the championship.

League standings

Promotion/relegation playoff
to be held before start 2009 season
March United n/p LLRC FT
NB: cancelled as top level is reduced to 10 clubs

References
Brunei 2007/08 (RSSSF)

Brunei Premier League seasons
Brunei
1
1